Route 2 on Hong Kong Island is a bus service operated by New World First Bus (NWFB), between Grand Promenade, Sai Wan Ho and Central (Macau Ferry) Bus Terminus, Sheung Wan.

History
The route was started in 1929 by Hong Kong Tramways between Royal Pier, Central and the east gate of Taikoo Dockyard, and had no number at that time. On 11 June 1933, China Motor Bus began operation of the route as part of its franchise of bus routes on Hong Kong Island, and the number "2" was assigned to this route. In 1934, the Central terminal was changed to HYF Ferry Pier. Since 1935, there were special daily services during the swimming season to the swimming yards at North Point.

During the Japanese occupation, service on the route was suspended. On 16 March 1947, service was resumed, with the Central terminus at Central Ferry Piers. In February 1948, there were five buses servicing the route, increased to ten in July, and a frequency of five minute per bus was achieved by November. Later the frequency was further increased to four minutes per bus, with 17 buses serving the route. Starting from 12 November 1949 the route was extended to Shau Kei Wan. In mid-1951, a short service between Central Ferry Piers and North Point was started, but was soon replaced by a new route 10 on 1 August 1951. In 1959, the service time was extended to 00:30 for the convenience of night ferry passengers. On 16 April 1962 service time was further extended to 01:20 in response to the extension of service time by HYF. On 16 June 1962, the Central terminus was changed to Jubilee Street.

In 1962, the first CMB double-decker, the Roline, started service on the route. On 22 January 1963, service of the first six CMB double-deckers started on Route 2. Because of the high level of patronage, CMB later had to introduce a large number of Guy Arab V double-deckers to operate this route.

On 21 October 1968, a special express service with no number was started, with a yellow sign that said "EXPRESS" hanging at every bus stop the express service serves. In early 1970 the service was designated an express service of Route 2. On 1 November 1973, the express service was cancelled and replaced by the newly designated route 20.

Route 2 was classified as an urban flat-road route in 1972, with a ticket price the cheapest amongst the then three types of CMB routes. In the same year the first rear-powered bus in Hong Kong, a Daimler "Jumbo" (RXF1, later SF1) was assigned to the route. The Central terminus was changed to Hong Kong-Macau Ferry Pier on 1 September 1982. In 1985, the terminal at Shau Kei Wan was moved to a newly constructed one. The completion of Island line caused a drop of patronage on the route.

On 1 September 1998, the route was handed over to NWFB with the franchise of CMB ended. In 2000 the route was designated a full air-conditioned route. On 3 June 2001, the route was changed to run via Gloucester Road for the westbound direction to Central, instead of Hennessy Road as part of NWFB's rearrangement of bus services, and the eastern terminus was changed to Aldrich Bay. On 30 June 2002, the Aldrich Bay direction started to serve the new Central Ferry Piers, and on 13 July 2003 even the eastbound direction to Aldrich started to use Gloucester Road. On 24 June 2006, the eastern terminus of the route was moved to the newly opened bus terminal under Grand Promenade.

Route

Central (Macau Ferry) towards Grand Promenade
The route length is 13.3 km in a time of 55 minutes, via:
Macau Ferry access road
Connaught Road Central
Man Kwong Street
Man Yiu Street
Harbour View Street
Exchange Square Bus Terminus
Connaught Road Central
Harcourt Road
Cotton Tree Drive
Queensway
Arsenal Street
Gloucester Road
Victoria Road
Causeway Bay Flyover
Glocester Road
Causeway Road
King's Road
Shau Kei Wan Road
Aldrich Street
Nam On Street
Shau Kei Wan Bus Terminus
Po Man Street
Mong Lung Street
Aldrich Bay Road
Oi Yin Street
Oi Kan Road
Tai On Street
Tai Hong Street

Grand Promenade towards Central (Macau Ferry)
The route length is 12.6 km in a time of 55 minutes, via:
Tai On Street
Oi Kan Road
Oi Yin Street
Aldrich Bay Road
Tung Hei Road
(unnamed road)
Nam On Street
Shau Kei Wan Bus Terminus
(unnamed road)
Nam On Land
Shau Kei Wan Road
King's Road
Kornhill Road
King's Road
Tung Lo Wan Road
Tai Hang Road Flyover
Glocester Road
Harcourt Road
Cotton Tree Drive
Queensway
Des Voeux Road Central
Hilly Street
Connaught Road Central
Macau Ferry access road

References

Bus routes in Hong Kong